Nebojša Kosović (born 24 February 1995) is a Montenegrin professional footballer who plays as a midfielder for Chinese Super League club Meizhou Hakka and the Montenegro national team.

Club career

Vojvodina
Born in Nikšić, Kosović joined Vojvodina as a trainee. He made his first team debut for the club in a 3–1 home league victory over Sloboda Užice on 9 April 2011. Until the end of the 2010–11 season, Kosović recorded one more league appearance, as the club finished in third place. He subsequently signed his first professional contract with Vojvodina, penning a three-year deal in February 2012. Kosović also made one league appearance in the 2011–12 season. He scored his first senior goal for the club in a 3–3 away draw against BSK Borča on 9 March 2013. In the following 2013–14 season, Kosović scored his first goal in UEFA competitions, finding the back of the net in a 4–1 away win over Maltese club Hibernians on 4 July 2013. He also extended his contract with Vojvodina in September 2013, to last until the summer of 2017.

Standard Liège
In January 2014, Kosović was transferred to Belgian side Standard Liège. He signed a four-and-a-half-year contract with Les Rouches, before being immediately loaned to Hungarian club Újpest. Led by his former manager Nebojša Vignjević, Kosović was a member of the team that won two major trophies (Magyar Kupa and Szuperkupa). He eventually returned to Standard Liège in the 2015 winter transfer window, but failed to make any competitive appearance for their first team.

Partizan
On 7 August 2015, Kosović moved back to Serbia and signed with Partizan, penning a four-year deal. He made his debut for the club on 22 August 2015, coming on as a substitute in a 3–1 away league win over Borac Čačak. On 12 March 2016, Kosović scored his first goal for Partizan in a 3–0 home league win over Voždovac with a bicycle kick. He helped the side win the Serbian Cup in his first season with the Crno-beli. In the following 2016–17 campaign, Kosović recorded 22 appearances and scored three goals in all competitions (league and cup), as Partizan won the double. In November 2018, he extended his contract with Partizan to June 2021.

Kairat
In the spring of 2019, Kosović signed a two-year contract with Kazakh club Kairat in a €450,000 transfer from Partizan.

Meizhou Hakka
On 21 April 2022, Kosović joined Chinese Super League club Meizhou Hakka.

International career
Kosović represented his country at the 2010 Summer Youth Olympics. He scored a brace in a 2–3 group stage loss against Singapore. Kosović also capped for Montenegro at under-17, under-19 and under-21 level.

On 29 May 2016, Kosović made his full international debut for Montenegro, coming on as a substitute in a 0–1 friendly loss away against Turkey.

Personal life
His nickname is Kića.

Statistics

Club

International

International goals
Scores and results list Montenegro's goal tally first.

Honours
Újpest
 Magyar Kupa: 2013–14
 Szuperkupa: 2014
Partizan
 Serbian SuperLiga: 2016–17
 Serbian Cup: 2015–16, 2016–17, 2017–18
Kairat
 Kazakhstan Premier League: 2020
 Kazakhstan Cup: 2021

Notes

References

External links

 
 
 
 
 

1995 births
Living people
Footballers from Nikšić
Association football midfielders
Montenegrin footballers
Montenegro youth international footballers
Montenegro under-21 international footballers
Montenegro international footballers
Footballers at the 2010 Summer Youth Olympics
FK Vojvodina players
Standard Liège players
Újpest FC players
FK Partizan players
FC Kairat players
Meizhou Hakka F.C. players
Serbian SuperLiga players
Nemzeti Bajnokság I players
Kazakhstan Premier League players
Chinese Super League players
Montenegrin expatriate footballers
Expatriate footballers in Serbia
Montenegrin expatriate sportspeople in Serbia
Expatriate footballers in Belgium
Montenegrin expatriate sportspeople in Belgium
Expatriate footballers in Hungary
Montenegrin expatriate sportspeople in Hungary
Expatriate footballers in Kazakhstan
Montenegrin expatriate sportspeople in Kazakhstan
Expatriate footballers in China
Montenegrin expatriate sportspeople in China